Penny Pax  is an American pornographic actress and model.

Early life
Pax was born in Miami, Florida and moved around often as a child. She is of Irish and German ancestry. She lived in Hawaii; Sacramento; and Pacifica, California, before moving to New Zealand when she was in the third grade. Nine months later, she moved to Fort Lauderdale, Florida, where she lived for thirteen years. She worked as a lifeguard for five years at various pools throughout South Florida, including those at the International Swimming Hall of Fame and at the Seminole Hard Rock Hotel and Casino Hollywood.

Career
Pax entered the adult film industry in November 2011. An agent in Florida, whom she never actually met, contacted her through Model Mayhem. In 2012, she was cast in the independent horror film Bloody Homecoming. In 2013, she starred in The Submission of Emma Marx, which is loosely based on Fifty Shades of Grey, earning several nominations in the course of 2014.

Awards and nominations

References

External links

 
 
 
 

Year of birth missing (living people)
Actresses from Miami
American expatriates in New Zealand
American female adult models
American pornographic film actresses
Living people
People from Pacifica, California
Pornographic film actors from Florida
21st-century American women